Astra 1KR is one of the Astra geostationary satellites owned and operated by SES, was purchased in June 2003. It was launched on 20 April 2006, 20:27:00 UTC as a replacement for Astra 1K, which failed to reach orbit on launch in November 2002. The launch of Astra 1KR was the first attempted by SES since the Astra 1K failure.

The satellite launched to 3.4° East for testing, before moving to Astra 19.2°E, where it replaced Astra 1B, which was effectively decommissioned, and Astra 1C, which was then elderly and running beneath full capacity. It was expected to also replace Astra 2C, which was under-utilised, and to allow that satellite to return to Astra 28.2°E to join Astra 2A / 2B / 2D to provide additional capacity. However, SES stated that Astra 1L would replace Astra 2C.

The first signals from the satellite at 19.2° East were direct replacements for four transponders on Astra 1B which had reached end-of-life and Astra 1C which was moved to 4.6° East.

See also 

 SES
 Astra
 Astra 19.2°E
 Astra 1K
 Astra 1B
 Astra 1C
 Astra 2C
 Astra 1E

References

External links 
 Astra 1KR page on SES
 Official SES trade/industry site
 SES fleet information and map
 

Astra satellites
Communications satellites in geostationary orbit
Spacecraft launched in 2006
2006 in Luxembourg
Satellites of Luxembourg
Satellites using the A2100 bus